The ECR Kooi Bridge is a bridge in Sheridan County, Wyoming, located  west of the community of Monarch. The bridge carries Sheridan County Road CN3-93 across the Tongue River. Contractor Jack Gregg built the bridge in 1913. The bridge's roadway was constructed with wooden stringers and decking; its guardrails are also wooden. The pin-connected Pratt pony truss was a common type of truss bridge in Wyoming, and the Kooi Bridge was one of the earlier bridges to use the design.

The bridge was added to the National Register of Historic Places in 1985. It was one of 31 Wyoming bridges added for their significance in the history of Wyoming bridge construction.

References

Road bridges on the National Register of Historic Places in Wyoming
Bridges completed in 1913
Buildings and structures in Sheridan County, Wyoming
1913 establishments in Wyoming
National Register of Historic Places in Sheridan County, Wyoming
Pratt truss bridges in the United States